Miyanosaka Station is the name of multiple railway stations in Japan: